Dubai Motor City is a property development in Dubai, United Arab Emirates, by Union Properties (a UAE based property development company). The development is based on a motor-sport theme and includes residential units, business towers, motor-sports facilities, retail and a theme park.

The key components of Dubai Motor City are:

 Dubai Autodrome - A 5.39 km FIA certified track which opened in October 2004. The first Dubailand attraction to ever open.
 UpTown MotorCity - A low-rise residential apartment development including recreational areas, parks and schools.
 Green Community MotorCity - Residential development consisting of family villas, townhouses, and bungalows as well as luxury terraced apartments.
 Business Park MotorCity - Office space in several high rise towers and retail space including automobile showrooms and other automobile related shops.
 F1-X Dubai - A Formula One theme park.

Apart from Dubai Autodrome which was opened in 2004 the remaining developments within MotorCity were due to be completed in 2009. However, in February 2009 Union Properties announced that the F1-X theme park would be put on hold and delayed due to the global financial crisis and problems with obtaining credit. Handover of UpTown MotorCity to owners started in phases during March 2009 and all residential units are now fully handed over.

Dubai Motor City now hosts a range of retail outlets ranging from a large supermarket to a various restaurants and other outlets.

Since the Global Financial Crisis decimated Dubai's economy in late 2008 work on some aspects of the project has completely ground to a halt, leaving the Marriott Hotel and The F1-X Theme Park half built.

External links
 Dubai Motor City - Official site

References

Communities in Dubai
Geography of Dubai
Motorsport in the United Arab Emirates
Dubailand